Bonk's Revenge, known as  in Japan and PC Kid 2 in Europe, is a 2D platformer set in prehistory, originally for the PC Engine/TurboGrafx-16 console, created in 1991 by the Red Company for Hudson Soft, and licensed by NEC. This is the second title in the Bonk series, and it was re-released for the TurboGrafx-16 in 1992 on the Gate of Thunder 4-in-1 game CD-ROM. A completely different game with the same name appeared on the Game Boy, whereas the original version was re-released for Wii Virtual Console and on the Japanese PlayStation Store. It was also released in Japan on Windows Store on December 13, 2013, and on Wii U Virtual Console on March 12, 2014. The title is also playable on the Turbografx-16/PC Engine Mini Console.

Gameplay
This time, the titular large-headed caveman is on a quest to recover half of the Moon, which was stolen by the evil King Drool III. Its multiple stages each contain several specific areas, which range from outdoors to trains to space to underwater. As in most platformers, Bonk has several crucial abilities: the I button causes him to jump; the II button causes him to "bonk," an action in which Bonk slams his head forward, inflicting a killing blow on most enemies; I jump-II combo causes Bonk to headbutt the Earth, killing enemies he lands on and creating a damaging shock wave; Holding down the II button in midair causes Bonk to spin and hover, allowing for long, controlled jumps. Bonk can also use his large mouth to grip onto allowed surfaces for climbing.  

Bonk's health is reflected in heart containers, similar to games in the Zelda series. Taking damage will cause Bonk to lose a certain amount of hearts, and hearts can be refilled through items, such as fruit, collected throughout the game. Bonk can also attain blue hearts that increase his amount of hearts, allowing him to effectively gain more health as the game progresses. The game also features Smileys, similar to coins in the Mario series, which are helpful when the player gets to the bonus round after each boss because they can get extra lives. Bonk can also turn invincible when he collects a large meat or two small meats, and can gain an extra life when he collects a small model of himself.

Power-up forms
Bonk is able to power-up and change into various forms by eating meat. 
With one small piece of meat, when he Bonks, a cloud floats towards enemies, freezing them when they come in contact. When he spins in the air, he has a cloud surrounding him. When he lands on his head, it freezes all enemies on-screen.  
With an additional small piece or one large piece, he becomes fully powered up and becomes temporarily invincible. In this form, he breathes fire, which destroys any enemies that come into contact with it.  When spinning, he is surrounded by fire, & when he lands, it causes damage to all enemies, and instantly destroys most, but not all of them on-screen.

Variations in gameplay
In the Game Boy version of this title, Bonk can turn into one of three unique heroes: Master Bonk, Hungry Bonk, or Stealth Bonk. Becoming Master Bonk dresses Bonk in a cape, provides him with Vulcan-esque ears, and gives him the ability to move faster and jump higher. Becoming Hungry Bonk gives Bonk an animalistic appearance with evil eyes and a mouth full of razor-sharp teeth, and gives Bonk the ability to chew enemies to death, as well as providing him with a much stronger headbutt that can kill nearby foes. Becoming Stealth Bonk dresses Bonk in a striped jail outfit, and gives him the ability to enter special locked doors that lead to areas such as the bank, where Bonk can collect Smileys, the butcher's, where Bonk can eat more slabs of meat in hope for a different power-up, and jail, where Bonk loses a portion of his Smileys.  

Grabbing one of many tulips scattered throughout the game carries Bonk to a special bonus stage where he can face off against Mechabonk -- a RoboCop-esque version of Bonk—in a best-of-three battle to "bonk" one another off the edge of a small stage. Winning two rounds provides Bonk with an extra life, while a loss transforms Bonk into Wounded Bonk, where Bonk resembles a mummy and takes twice as much damage as usual.  

The game overall is very similar to games in the Mario series, providing linear, side-scrolling action, multiple power-ups, and several small boss confrontations leading up to a final boss. Its treatment of power-ups is similar as well: taking a hit while powered-up causes Bonk to take no damage, but instead lose his power. For those who struggle with the game, the game offers passwords after game overs, so the player does not need to start over from the beginning.

Plot
TBA

Development
TBA

Reception
In the United Kingdom, PC Kid 2 was the top-selling PC Engine game in September 1991.

Reviewing the Game Boy game, GamePro commented that the game is fun but too short and easy, offering "not much more than an afternoon or two of challenge."

Entertainment Weekly gave the game a B.

French gaming magazine  gave PC Kid II a 97% score.

Notes

References

External links 
 The Bonk Compendium (Covering all games and references to Bonk)
 

Game Boy games
TurboGrafx-16 games
Virtual Console games
Virtual Console games for Wii U
PlayStation Network games
Windows games
Platform games
1991 video games
Red Entertainment games
Bonk (series)
Single-player video games
Video games developed in Japan
Video game sequels